Chen Sung-young (1 July 1941 – 17 December 2021) was a Taiwanese actor. He received the Golden Horse Award for Best Actor in 1989. He died on 17 December 2021, at the age of 80.

Selected filmography
City of Sadness (1989)
The Dull Ice Flower (1989)
Prison on Fire II (1991) 
Dust of Angels (1992)
Fong Sai-yuk (1993)
The Great Conqueror's Concubine (1994)
Gorgeous (1999)
Born to Be King (2000)
Feng Shui Family (2012–2014)

References

External links

1941 births
2021 deaths
Taiwanese Buddhists
Taiwanese male film actors
Taiwanese male television actors
Taiwanese people of Hoklo descent
Taiwanese Taoists
20th-century Taiwanese male actors
21st-century Taiwanese male actors